The 2014–15 Wake Forest Demon Deacons men's basketball team represented Wake Forest University during the 2014–15 NCAA Division I men's basketball season. The Demon Deacons were led by first-year head coach Danny Manning. The team played home games at the Lawrence Joel Veterans Memorial Coliseum in Winston-Salem, North Carolina, and was a member of the Atlantic Coast Conference. They finished the season 13–19, 5–11 in ACC play to finish twelfth place. They lost in the first round of the ACC tournament to Virginia Tech.

Previous season
The Demon Deacons finished the season 13–19, 5–13 in ACC play to finish in a three-way tie for 11th place. They advanced to the second round of the ACC tournament where they lost to Pittsburgh.

Departures

Recruiting

Roster

Schedule

|-
!colspan=9 style="background:#000000; color:#cfb53b;"| Exhibition

|-
!colspan=9 style="background:#000000; color:#cfb53b;"|Regular non-conference season

|-
!colspan=9 style="background:#000000; color:#cfb53b;"|ACC Regular Season

|-
!colspan=9 style="background:#000000; color:#cfb53b;"| ACC tournament

Season Highs

References

Wake Forest Demon Deacons men's basketball seasons
Wake Forest